In 1936, it was an amateur non official Tournament (“Division de Honor”) of Lima and Callao but organized by F.P.F.

No official tournament took place, because the Peru national football team competed at the 1936 Berlin Olympic Games and 1937 South American Championship

The sports spirit had much to do in the realization of the tournament. It should be remembered that soccer in Peru was amateur, so that all football activity was more a social goal than an economic one. In the case of Lima, the performance of the main teams in the capital was missed for much of the year, so it was convenient to give activity to all players who were not considered in the squad that traveled to the 1937 South American Championship in Argentina. In short, the tournament was basically played to generate domestic competition.

Knockout phase

Quarterfinals

Semifinals

Final

References

External links
RSSSF

Peru
Tor